Alexander Keith Johnston (184428 June 1879 in Tanzania) was a Scottish explorer, cartographer and geographer.

He was the son of published geographer Alexander Keith Johnston (1804–1871) and Mary Grey.

From 1873 to 1875 he was geographer to a commission for the survey of Paraguay. He led a Royal Geographical Society expedition to Lake Nyasa and Lake Tanganyika. After only six weeks of the expedition Johnston died from malaria and dysentery in the village of Beho Beho in what is now the Selous Game Reserve, Tanzania .  He was accompanied by fellow Scot Joseph Thomson (explorer) who successfully completed the expedition.

Several expeditions were conducted by * Mike Shand (University of Glasgow) to find the grave of Keith Johnston at Behobeho between 2001 and 2004.  The grave searches have been documented in a chapter of the book  *Wild Heart of Africa - The Selous Game Reserve in Tanzania, edited by Rolf Baldus and published by Rowland Ward in 2009.

He is memorialised on his father's grave in Grange Cemetery in Edinburgh.

References 

  James McCarthy, Journey into Africa: The Life and Death of Keith Johnston, Scottish Cartographer and Explorer (1844–79) (Caithness, Scotland: Whittles Publishers, 2004) 
Wild Heart of Africa - The Selous Game Reserve in Tanzania, edited by Rolf Baldus
To the Central African Lakes and Back by Joseph Thomson (explorer) (2 vols., 1881)
Search for the Grave of Keith Johnston Keith Johnston (cartographer)

1844 births
1879 deaths
19th-century explorers
19th-century Scottish people
British explorers of Africa
Scottish explorers
Scottish geographers